Theresa Qristina Ribohn Plückthun, better known as "Farmen-Qristina" (born 2October 1955 in Skånela, Sigtuna Municipality) is a Swedish reality television contestant, drug counselor and politician for the Swedish Social Democratic Party. She focuses on children and youths that has different problems such as with drugs, as part of the Children and Youth Committee in Karlshamn municipality. She became publicly known after participating as a contestant on the first season of the reality series The Farm in 2001, she participated again as a "joker" in the 2004 season. The series was broadcast on TV4. She has then participated three times in Fort Boyard also on TV4, she participated in The Bar in 2001, which was broadcast on TV3. She further participated in the stop smoking show Fimpa Nu! in 2004 on TV4 Plus. In 2005, Ribohn participated in the reality series Club Goa which was filmed in Goa in India, along with some of Sweden's best known reality series contestants. In 2016, Ribohn participated in the second series of the reality series Realitystjärnorna på godset along with television celebrities such as Victoria Silvstedt and Meral Tasbas.

References 

Living people
1955 births
Swedish politicians
20th-century Swedish women politicians
20th-century Swedish politicians
21st-century Swedish women politicians
Swedish television personalities
Swedish women television presenters
People from Sigtuna Municipality
The Farm (TV series) contestants